Paramontana mayana, common name May's turrid, is a species of sea snail, a marine gastropod mollusk in the family Raphitomidae.

Description
The length of the shell attains 6 mm, its diameter 2 mm.

(Original description) The small, lanceolate, subturretedshell is rather thin. Its colour is uniform white or uniform cinnamon, or white spotted with cinnamon. The shell contains 6 whorls, including a two-whorled protoconch. 

The sculpture is variable, according as extra threads are or are not intercalated. The radials extendi from suture to base and traverse the basal furrow, narrow, discontinuous from whorl to whorl, perpendicular, twelve to fourteen to a whorl. The spirals number from eleven to fifteen, according to presence or absence of intercalated threads. On the snout six or seven close and knotted threads, then a wide basal furrow followed by from five to eight fine threads which by intersection with the radials on the peripheral area enclose large meshes. On the upper whorls are from two to four spirals. The aperture is open and toothless. The varix is much thicker than the ribs. The sinus is very small. The siphonal canal is short and open.

Distribution
This marine species is endemic to Australia and occurs off Tasmania.

References

 May, W.L. 1923. An illustrated index of Tasmanian shells: with 47 plates and 1052 species. Hobart : Government Printer 100 pp.
 Powell, A.W.B. 1966. The molluscan families Speightiidae and Turridae, an evaluation of the valid taxa, both Recent and fossil, with list of characteristic species. Bulletin of the Auckland Institute and Museum. Auckland, New Zealand 5: 1–184, pls 1–23

External links
 
 Grove, S.J. (2018). A Guide to the Seashells and other Marine Molluscs of Tasmania: Paramontana mayana

mayana
Gastropods described in 1922
Gastropods of Australia